Mizzima TV is a Burmese digital free-to-air TV channel that run under MRTV's Multiplex Playout System based in Yangon, Myanmar. Mizzima TV is operated by Mizzima Media Co.ltd. They have signed a cooperation agreement with state-run Myanmar Radio and Television (MRTV) to operate as content providers for digital free-to-air TV channels in a multi-playout system of MRTV on 17 February 2018. Due to the 2021 military coup, television programming are cut off from MRTV Digital Multiplex.

See also 
 Television in Myanmar

References

External links
 

Television channels in Myanmar
Television channels and stations established in 2018
2018 establishments in Myanmar